The Speaker of the Wisconsin State Assembly is the presiding officer of the Wisconsin State Assembly, the lower house of the Wisconsin Legislature.  Article IV of the Constitution of Wisconsin, ratified in 1848, establishes the legislature and specifies the election of officers.  The role and responsibilities of the speaker are defined in the Assembly Rules, originally in Rule 1, and also, under the present rules, Rule 3.

Selection

The speaker is chosen by a majority vote of the Assembly members at the start of each session or whenever a vacancy occurs in the role during a session, as such, the speaker is almost always the de facto leader of the Assembly's majority party. A speaker pro tempore is elected concurrent with the election of the speaker, to carry out the speaker's duties in his or her absence. Unlike the United States House of Representatives, the rules of the Assembly require that the speaker and speaker pro tempore be elected from among the members of the Assembly.

Powers and duties

The speaker is empowered to make all Assembly committee assignments and office assignments for members, and supervises all officers of the Assembly. The speaker is required to authenticate all acts, orders, or proceedings from the Assembly, and, with the countersignature of the chief clerk, issues all subpoenas on behalf of the Assembly or its committees.

Current Speaker 

The current Speaker of the Assembly for the 105th Wisconsin Legislature is Robin Vos of Burlington, Racine County, Wisconsin.  He is the 79th speaker since the establishment of the State Assembly and the 75th person to hold the office.  He is currently serving his fourth term as speaker, first elected to the role on January 7, 2013.

The Speaker pro tempore is Representative Tyler August of Lake Geneva, Walworth County, Wisconsin.  This is his third full term in the role after being elected by the caucus in the October 2013.

List of speakers

Wisconsin Territory (18361848)

Wisconsin State Assembly (1848Present)

See also
 Constitution of Wisconsin
 Wisconsin State Assembly
 Wisconsin Legislature

References 

Speakers of the Wisconsin State Assembly